Tierra Comunera (TC) is a Castilian nationalist political party in the Spanish historical region of Castile. It is modelled after the Basque and Catalan nationalist parties but does not advocate full independence for Castile, instead favoring cooperation or unification among what they call the five Castilian regions within Spain (Castile and León, Castile-La Mancha, Madrid, Cantabria and La Rioja). It considers itself a left-of-centre, social democratic and environmentalist party. It is contesting the 2021 Madrilenian regional election allied with Zero Cuts, Castilian Party and The Greens–Green Group. It also contested the 2019 Madrilenian regional election allied with the Castilian Party. In 2019, they finished 13th with 0.06% of the vote.

Election results

Cortes of Castile and León

Cortes of Castilla–La Mancha

Assembly of Madrid

References

Castilian nationalism
Defunct political parties in Spain